James Cecil, 1st Marquess of Salisbury,  (4 September 1748 – 13 June 1823), styled Viscount Cranborne until 1780 and known as The Earl of Salisbury between 1780 and 1789, was a British nobleman and politician.

Background
Salisbury was the son of James Cecil, 6th Earl of Salisbury, and Elizabeth, daughter of Edward Keat.

Political career

Salisbury was returned to Parliament for Great Bedwyn in 1774, a seat he held until 1780, and briefly represented Launceston and Plympton Erle in 1780. In the latter year, he succeeded his father in the earldom of Salisbury and entered the House of Lords. He served under Lord North as Treasurer of the Household between 1780 and 1782 and under William Pitt the Younger and then Henry Addington as Lord Chamberlain of the Household between 1783 and 1804. He was admitted to the Privy Council in 1780 and created Marquess of Salisbury, in the County of Wiltshire, in 1789. He later served as Joint Postmaster General under Lord Liverpool from 1816 to 1823. He also held the honorary post of Lord Lieutenant of Hertfordshire between 1771 and 1823. He was made a Knight of the Garter in 1793.

Militia career
He served as Colonel of the Hertfordshire Militia in home defence during the War of American Independence. To help his discharged men re-enter civilian life at the end of the war, he employed 200 of them on the improvements he was making to his Hatfield estate. He was still in command of the regiment when it was called out again in 1793.

Family
Lord Salisbury married Lady Emily Mary, daughter of Wills Hill, 1st Marquess of Downshire, on 2 December 1773. She became known as a sportswoman and influential society hostess. The couple had four children:

Lady Georgiana Charlotte Augusta Cecil (1786-1860), married Henry Wellesley, 1st Baron Cowley
Lady Emily Anne Bennet Elizabeth Cecil (1789-1858), married George Nugent, 1st Marquess of Westmeath and had issue
Caroline Cecil, died young
James Brownlow William Gascoyne-Cecil, 2nd Marquess of Salisbury (1791–1868)

Lord Salisbury died in June 1823, aged 74, and was succeeded by his only son, James. The Marchioness of Salisbury died in a fire at Hatfield House in November 1835.

Notes

References 
 The Gentleman's Magazine: and Historical Chronicle From January To June 1823, Vol. XCIII (London: John Nichols and Son, 1823). Obituary Section, p. 563.  googlebooks.com Retrieved 28 October 2007

1748 births
1823 deaths
British MPs 1774–1780
James, Salisbury 1
Knights of the Garter
Lord-Lieutenants of Hertfordshire
Salisbury1
James
Cranborne, James Cecil, Viscount
Members of the Privy Council of Great Britain
Treasurers of the Household
United Kingdom Postmasters General
Members of the Parliament of Great Britain for constituencies in Cornwall
Fellows of the Royal Society
Members of Parliament for Great Bedwyn